Latinus was an Alemannic warrior. 

From 351 to 354 he served as comes domesticorum in the Roman army under emperor Constantius II. In 354, he was along with Agilo and Scudilo suspected of having warned the Alemannic king Vadomarius of an impending Roman military attack.

Sources

4th-century Germanic people
Alemannic warriors
Ancient Roman military personnel